The Bridge at Lo-Yang,, is a 1975 Hong Kong action fantasy film directed by Lung Chien,  and starring Barry Chan and Lu-Ling Li.

Plot 

During the Song dynasty, a river separates people on both sides. Many people always move when the ferries capsize in its turbulent waters. Legend has it that the Turtle and Snake demons live under its waters. Cai Yuan Xuan is sent to inspect the bridge, but the work will not be easy..

Cast

 Barry Chan
 Lu-Ling Li
 Erh Liang
 Ming Liu
 Lu-Sha Chen
 Pi Chen
 Yun Fei
 Ah-San Ge

References

External links

1970 films
1970s fantasy films
1970s Cantonese-language films
Films shot in Hong Kong
Hong Kong action films
1970s Mandarin-language films
Films directed by Lung Chien
1970s Hong Kong films